Royal Racing Football Club Montegnée was a Belgian association football club from the municipality of Saint-Nicolas, Liège. It last played in the Liège Division 4, 8th tier overall in the Belgian league system.

History 

Racing Football Club Montegnée was founded in 1915, it received the matricule number 77. It first appeared in the second division in 1923. In 1925 it was relegated to the third division but it came back four years later and won the second division that season. The club then played its only season at the highest level in Belgian football finishing 13th on 14 (before R.S.C. Anderlecht). Montegnée then spent some seasons in the second division until 1938 (except in 1933–34) when it was relegated to the third division again. The club would never come back at the highest two levels.

It was awarded the Royal Stamp in 1952 and became Royal Racing Football Club Montegnée.

After a new appearance in Third Division, the club was relegated two seasons in a row to the Liége Provincial league. But RRFC Montegnée were promoted back to the national Promotion D league on 6 June 2010, with a 5–0 playoff final win against FC Herk. However they were relegated back to the Liège leagues in 2011 for finishing 14th out of 16 in Promotion D. They spent their final season, through demotion, in the bottom division after one season each in the top two. In June 2014 Montegnée merged with Royal Ans Football Club (matricule number 617) because of their and Ans' financial problems to become Royal Ans-Montegnée FC, receiving the number 9638. Both clubs ceased to exist and their matricule numbers were expunged. The new club is now playing in Liège's fourth and bottom division.

References

External links 

 
 Belgian football clubs history
 RSSSF Archive: 1st and 2nd division final tables

Defunct football clubs in Belgium
Association football clubs established in 1915
1915 establishments in Belgium
Association football clubs disestablished in 2014
2014 disestablishments in Belgium
R.R.F.C. Montegnée
Belgian Pro League clubs